Ahsan Habib is a Bangladeshi cartoonist, writer and editor of Unmad, a satire magazine.

Early life
Habib was the third son of Faizur Rahman Ahmed and Ayesha Foyez. His father, a police officer, was killed by the Pakistani army during the liberation war of Bangladesh in 1971. His elder brother, Humayun Ahmed, was a writer and film-maker. Another brother, Muhammed Zafar Iqbal, is also a writer and educationist. Habib is married to Afroza Amin and they are parents to only child Shabnam Ahsan.

Due to his father's occupation, Habib spent his childhood in different parts of Bangladesh - Jagdal, Panchagarh, Rangamati, Bandarban, Chittagong, Bogra, Comilla and Pirojpur.

Education
Habib studied in more than eight schools before the SSC exam. He earned MSc degree in geography from the University of Dhaka.

Career
Habib started career as a cartoonist and writer. He is the editor of Unmad, a satire magazine running since the early 1980s. He was the editor of the Bengali science fiction magazines, Moulik, Autoline, and Ghuddi. He is an adviser of Bangladesh Cartoonist Association.

As a cartoonist, Habib designed many covers. He also worked on writing Sher, a short witty 3/4 lined satiric poem, mainly found in the Indian Subcontinent.

In 2015 he joined as a professor of Daffodil International University in department of Multimedia and Creative Technology (MCT). His area of teaching is Graphic Novel.

Books
 Ira namer horin

Jokes
 Rat Barotar Porer Jokes
 Four Twenty Four Hour Jokes
 Jokes Somogro
 999 Ta Jokes Ekta Fao
 1001 Ta Jokes 1ta Missing
 Valentine Jokes
 Jini Jokes
 Big and Small Jokes

Non-fiction
 Abjab
 Likhte Likhte Lekhok
 Baba Jokhon Akkebare Coto
 Eshkul Time
 Office Time
 Jaha Bolibo Mittha Boilobo
 Voot Jokhon Ghost

Science fiction
 Paowel Broonskir Bichar

References

Living people
Bangladeshi cartoonists
Bangladeshi non-fiction writers
Bangladeshi science fiction writers
Bengali writers
Bengali-language writers
Family of Humayun Ahmed
University of Dhaka alumni
People from Netrokona District
1957 births